Helly Nahmad may refer to either of two cousins, both art dealers and gallery owners:
 Helly Nahmad (London), owner of Helly Nahmad London, and son of Ezra Nahmad
 Helly Nahmad (New York art collector), owner of Helly Nahmad Gallery in New York, and son of David Nahmad